The Sun Odyssey 54 DS (Deck Salon) is a French  cruising sailboat, with the hull designed by Jacques Fauroux, the Jeanneau Design Office providing finishing and Vittorio Garroni the styling. Work was commenced in 2002 and production started in 2004.

For the yacht charter business the design was sold as Moorings 54 and the Moorings 554 with different cabin configurations.

The design was replaced in the company line in 2008 by the Jeanneau Yachts 53.

Production
The design was built by Jeanneau in France, starting in 2004, but it is now out of production.

Design
The Sun Odyssey 54 DS is a recreational keelboat, built predominantly of fiberglass with a wooden substructure and trim. The deck has a balsa core. It has a masthead sloop rig, with a keel-stepped mast, three sets of swept spreaders and aluminum spars with discontinuous stainless steel wire rigging. The hull has a nearly plumb stem, a reverse transom with steps and a swimming platform, an internally mounted spade-type rudder controlled by dual wheels and a fixed fin keel with a weighted bulb or optional deep-draft keel. The fin keel model displaces  and carries  of cast iron ballast, while the deep draft version carries  of ballast.

The boat is fitted with a Japanese Yanmar 4JH4 HTE  turbocharged diesel engine for docking and maneuvering.

The design was built with a range of interiors, providing sleeping accommodation for seven to nine people. A typical layout has a double "V"-berth in the bow cabin, three bunks just aft of the bow, two "U"-shaped settees and a straight settee in the main cabin and an aft cabin with a double berth. Alternative arrangements provide up to four berths in the aft cabin. The galley is located on the port side at the companionway ladder. The galley is "C"-shaped and is equipped with a stove, a refrigerator and a double sink. A navigation station is opposite the galley, on the starboard side. There are four heads, two forward and two aft.

Operational history
In a 2004 review in Cruising World, John Kretschmer wrote, "Gusty southwest winds ranged from 12 to 21 knots as we unrolled the main and full genoa and shot off across the bay on a close reach. The acceleration was impressive as I watched the speedo arch past 7 and finally settle in at 8.3 knots. We were slightly overpowered with the 135-percent genoa, and the helm felt better when we shortened the headsail a tad. This is when you appreciate the load-bearing headsail leads. Hardening the sheets, we pinched up to inside 40 degrees apparent and kept the boat moving at more than 7 knots. The inboard shrouds allow for close sheeting angles. Even hard on the wind, the heeling was minimal, and there was no sign of pounding; of course, we were sailing in protected waters. The high freeboard contributes to the boat's dryness."

See also
List of sailing boat types

References

External links

Keelboats
2000s sailboat type designs
Sailing yachts
Sailboat type designs by Jeanneau Design Office
Sailboat type designs by Jacques Fauroux
Sailboat type designs by Vittorio Garroni
Sailboat types built by Jeanneau